Darating ang Umaga  (International title: Till Morning Comes / ) is a Philippine drama made by ABS-CBN aired from March 3 to November 14, 2003, replacing Sa Dulo ng Walang Hanggan. Starring Vina Morales and Eula Valdez. It also starred Jodi Sta. Maria and Ian Veneracion, who 12 years later would team up in yet another primetime drama along with Patrick Garcia from Pangako Sa 'Yo (ended in September 2002). The drama series was also competing with Habang Kapiling Ka of the rival network GMA Network after it premiered in November four months earlier.

Story
A medallion is crafted to bring fortune to the Banal Family and to their next generations of kin. Eventually, greed prevails and the medallion is broken into two, thereon carrying a curse in the entire Banal clan. The curse soon came in the form of a man named Don Lucio Riego de Dios. With his arrival in the lives of Milagros and Ramon, a cycle of endless and ruthless sufferings begin until these misfortunes are carried on to their daughters (Mira and Arriana) and to everyone they are bound to love. Their only chance to experience happiness and peace rests on the mending of the broken medallion. Don Lucio however, vows never to see the end of the curse on the Banals. It is Arriana's mission to save her family from oppression, but it entails a sacrifice that may be far greater than what Arriana is able to make.

Cast and characters

Main cast 
 Eula Valdez as Almira "Mira" Banal-Cordero
 Vina Morales as Arriana "Anya" Banal-Cordero

Supporting cast 
 Ian Veneracion as Jaime Abelardo "Abel" Reverente
 Jodi Sta. Maria as Nicole del Fuego
 Patrick Garcia as Nathaniel Cordero-Reverente
 Danilo Barrios as Daniel / Rafael Cordero-Reverente 
 Aiza Marquez as Ella

Recurring cast 
 Dante Rivero as Don Lucio Riego de Dios
 Daria Ramirez as Milagros Banal-Cordero
 Glydel Mercado as Gertrudis Del Fuego
 Spanky Manikan as Ramon Cordero
 Aljon Jimenez as Dagon Del Fuego
 Sarji Ruiz as Timothy Del Fuego
 Bobby Andrews as Raymond de Dios
 James Cooper as Casper

Trivia
 Jodi Sta. Maria and Ian Veneracion first worked together in this drama, with Veneracion portraying Sta. Maria's father in law. In 2015, they reunited in Pangako Sa 'Yo that would catapult them into a popular love-team up. Also, Eula Valdez makes her comeback in the 2002 original primetime series of the same title since it ended in September last year six months ago.
It was also re-aired twice in 2006 on Pinoy Central TV (now called Kapamilya Channel) and re-aired in 2007 in English.
In 2003 it became a 50th Soap Opera Offering on ABS-CBN's 50th Year of Television.
Vina Morales and Eula Valdez' first team up on Primetime Television as Siblings and Second in 2007's remake of Loida Virina's 80's Hit and long-running Soap "Flordeluna" which was retitled as "Maria Flordeluna".
The theme song of the soap-opera was originally performed by Raymond Lauchengco became the theme song of the 1983 film with the same title. In 2008, the theme song of the soap-opera entitled Sine Novela: Saan Darating ang Umaga? became an afternoon drama of ABS-CBN's rival station, the GMA Network as well as Pyra: Babaeng Apoy in 2013. The theme song is recently used by another teleserye Budoy'', aired on ABS-CBN.
Ian Veneracion played the father of Patrick Garcia's character despite being only 6 years older than the former.

See also
Saan Darating ang Umaga?
Budoy
Pyra: Babaeng Apoy
List of dramas of ABS-CBN
List of programs aired by ABS-CBN

References

External links
 

Philippine drama films
ABS-CBN drama series
2003 Philippine television series debuts
2003 Philippine television series endings
Television series by Star Creatives
Fantaserye and telefantasya
Filipino-language television shows
Television shows set in the Philippines